Leopold Lojka (also spelt Leopold Loyka) (17 September 1886 – 18 July 1926) was the chauffeur of the car carrying Austro-Hungarian Archduke Franz Ferdinand at the time of Ferdinand's assassination in Sarajevo in 1914.

Biography
Lojka was born on 17 September 1886 in the town of Telč in southern Moravia in the Austro-Hungarian Empire (now part of the Czech Republic). He became a professional chauffeur in the service of Franz, Count Harrach, an Austro-Hungarian nobleman and recent acquaintance of the heir to the Austro-Hungarian throne, Archduke Franz Ferdinand.

Lojka accompanied his employer and met the Archduke on his trip to Sarajevo on 28 June 1914 where he served as Ferdinand's chauffeur on his fateful journey. Shortly after leaving the Philippe Barracks where Ferdinand and his wife had joined the Colonel's car they were attacked by a young Bosnian, who threw a grenade at it. However, Lojka was able to swerve out of the way and the grenade bounced away, injuring several dignitaries in the car behind and a number of spectators on the street.

After giving a speech at the Town Hall and despite being due to open the new city Museum, Ferdinand decided to visit those injured by the bomb in the hospital. However, this wasn't part of the planned route and Lojka, a Czech, was not familiar with the new route and therefore the role of guiding the cavalcade was passed to mayor Fehim Efendi Curčić. Consequently, whilst driving away from the Town Hall when Curčić took the wrong right-turn down a side street (Franz Josef Strasse on the original route to the Museum) Lojka did as instructed and followed the car in front who had made this error. Chastised for his mistake and told to stop by Governor Potiorek, Lojka did as instructed. However, it so happened that Young Bosnia member Gavrilo Princip was standing in front of the Deli on the street corner just as Ferdinand's car began to pull into it. Princip seized his chance and with his Model 1910 380ACP pistol in hand he lunged through the crowd. Lojka was attempting to reverse, and Gavrilo Princip shot and killed the Archduke, shooting him in the jugular vein, and his wife Sophie, in the stomach.

After the assassination, Lojka was given the task of sending three telegrams of apology: one to the Austro-Hungarian Emperor Franz Joseph, one to the German Emperor Wilhelm II, and one to the children of Archduke Franz Ferdinand. 
He also served as a witness for the prosecution in the Young Bosnia trial.

Lojka was later awarded 400,000 crowns by Austro-Hungarian emperor Charles I, which he used to buy an inn at Brno in Czechoslovakia. There he became an innkeeper, and would often show off the bloodstained braces of Franz Ferdinand and a piece of Sophie's golden bracelet.

He died in Brno in 1926 at just 39 years old. Since Lojka's death, the role of the chauffeur of Franz Ferdinand's car has sometimes been erroneously attributed to a 'Franz Urban'.

The Archduke and his wife had in fact travelled from the Station to the Philippe Barracks in a different car - that of Count Alexander von Boos-Waldeck (the car later damaged by the bomb attack).  The driver of that car is argued to be Otto Merz, the award winning motor racing driver - which car was relegated to the trailing car at the Barracks when the royal couple were encouraged to switch cars and take up seats in the Harrach vehicle (which they had earlier judged as unsafe) - official records however name the driver as Karl Divjak.  Whilst there are stories which claim that after the bombing Merz was forced to bring Ferdinand's bloodstained speech to the town hall on foot, these seem refuted by the stories from Baron von Rumerskirch, the Archduke's adjunct, which claim the speech, splattered in blood, travelled with him in Robert Grein's car to the town hall where he personally handed it to the Archduke, only then noticing the blood stains.

Gallery

Notes

Literature
 Jiří Skoupý: Šofér, který změnil dějiny (The chauffeur who changed history), 2017, Mladá fronta, 

1886 births
1926 deaths
People from Telč
People from the Margraviate of Moravia
Austro-Hungarian people of World War I